Father Knows Best is an American radio and television sitcom.

Father Knows Best may also refer to:

Father Knows Best, an anthology of three novels by Judith Arnold: Father Found, Father Christmas, and Father of Two

Television episodes 
"Father Knows Best" (Dexter), 2006
"Father Knows Best" (Fresh Prince of Bel-Air), 1994
"Father Knows Best" (The Bernie Mac Show), 
"Father Knows Best???" (Perfect Strangers), a two-part episode of Perfect Strangers
"Father Knows Best", an episode of Tyler Perry's House of Payne
"Father Knows Best", an episode of Gideon's Crossing
"Father Knows Best", an episode of The Tortellis
"Father Knows Best", an episode of High Incident
"Father Knows Best", an episode of Eight is Enough 
"Father Knows Best", an episode of Pretty Little Liars
"Father Knows Best, Even When He's a Ghost", an episode of Ghostly Encounters
"The Father Knows Best", the alternative title of The O.C. episode "The Test"

See also
Father Does Know Best: The Lauren Chapin Story by Lauren Chapin and Andrew Collins
"Father Knows Beast", an episode of Ghostbusters (1986 TV series)
"Father Knows Death", an episode of The War Next Door
"Father Knows Worst", an episode of The Simpsons

Father Knows..., the film directed by Toby Ross
Mother Knows Best (disambiguation)